Ostracoberyx is a genus of shellskin alfonsinos, the only recognized genus in the family Ostracoberycidae.  This is a genus of deep-water fishes native to the Indian and western Pacific oceans.

Species
There are currently three recognized species in this genus:
 Ostracoberyx dorygenys Fowler, 1934
 Ostracoberyx fowleri Matsubara, 1939
 Ostracoberyx paxtoni Quéro & Ozouf-Costaz, 1991 (Spinycheek seabass)

References

Perciformes genera
Extant Eocene first appearances
Percoidea